Jawahar Navodaya Vidyalaya, Karauli, also known as JNV Jatnagla, is located in Hindaun Tehsil, Karauli district in Rajasthan state of India. Jawahar Navodaya Vidyalaya Karauli is a schools for talented children and forms a part of Jawahar Navodaya Vidyalaya group of nationwide government schools. Its target group are talented rural children, aiming to provide them with an education comparable to the best in a residential school system, without regard to their family's Social economy condition. The Vidyalaya is run by Navodaya Vidyalaya Samiti, New Delhi, an autonomous organization under the Department of Education and Literacy, M.H.R.D., government of India.

History
This school was established in 1992. The permanent campus near Jatnagla was completed in 2009, and the school was shifted there. This school is administered and monitored by Jaipur regional office of Navodaya Vidyalaya Samiti.

Affiliations
Jawahar Navodaya Vidyalaya Karauli is a fully residential, co-educational school affiliated to the Central Board of Secondary Education, New Delhi and has classes from VI to XII standard. The CBSE affiliation number is 1740032, and JNV Karauli follows the curriculum prescribed by the CBSE.

Geographic location
Locally it is known as Jawahar Navodaya Vidyalaya Jatnangla or JNV Jatnagla.

See also
 List of JNV schools
 Hindaun City railway station 
 Hindaun City Bus Depot

References

External links 

 Official Website of JNV Karauli

Jawahar Navodaya Vidyalayas in Rajasthan
Hindaun
Educational institutions established in 2005
2005 establishments in Rajasthan